Bertya opponens is a shrub/tree in the family Euphorbiaceae, native to Australia and found in New South Wales and Queensland.  It is found on ridges amongst mallee in shallow soils. It flowers in July and August.

Description
Bertya opponens is a shrub or small tree growing to 4 m high, and has a dense covering of whitish to brownintertwined hairs.
The leaves are mostly opposite, and are 10–50 mm long and 5–25 mm wide, with glands at the apex. The leaves have hairy upper surfaces, which become rough with age, and lower surfaces which are densely covered with intertwined white hairs, and having a prominent midrib. The leaf margins are recurved to revolute.  The leaf stalk (petiole) is  3–5 mm long.
The flowers are both stalked and stalkless. The plant carries 1–3 male and female flowers together. There are four narrow conspicuous bracts, 2–5 mm long, which are densely covered in matted yellowish brown hairs, and two inner bracts which may or may not be obscure, and which are very sticky. There are four perianth segments which are broad-ovate, 5–6 mm long, and mostly hairless and sticky. In the female flower, the segments fused towards the base. The ovary is densely covered with unmatted hairs (villous) and is mostly four-lobed.
The capsule is almost spherical, about 8–9 mm long, and densely covered with long shaggy hairs which are not matted.

The species was first described as Croton opponens by Ferdinand von Mueller in 1873, and redescribed by Guymer in 1985 as a Bertya, giving the name, Bertya opponens.

Gallery

References

External links 
 Bertya opponens (National recovery plan)
Bertya opponens - vulnerable species listing, Office of Environment and Heritage, NSW
Coolabar Bertya profile, Office of Environment and Heritage, NSW
Bertya opponens (specimen k000959526)

opponens
Flora of New South Wales
Flora of Queensland
Taxa named by Ferdinand von Mueller
Plants described in 1873